Mandela is a 1987 British television drama film directed by Philip Saville and written by Ronald Harwood. The film stars Danny Glover as Nelson Mandela and Alfre Woodard as his wife Winnie. The film premiered on HBO on 20 September 1987.

Plot

Cast
 Danny Glover as Nelson Mandela
 Alfre Woodard as Winnie Madikizela-Mandela
 John Matshikiza as Walter Sisulu
 John Indi as Oliver Tambo
 Juanita Waterman as Adelaide Tambo 
 Saul Reichlin as  Bram Fischer 
 Xoliswa Sithole as Zindzi Mandela
 Gertrude Rook as Zeni Mandela 
 Nathan Dambuza Mdledle as  Albert Luthuli 
 Mike Phillips as Denis Goldberg
 John Indi as Bamuthi

References

External links
 

1987 television films
1987 films
1987 drama films
HBO Films films
Films about Nelson Mandela
Cultural depictions of Nelson Mandela
Cultural depictions of Winnie Mandela
Peabody Award-winning broadcasts
Films directed by Philip Saville
Films shot in Zimbabwe
Apartheid films
1980s English-language films
1980s British films
British drama television films